Tomb Raider is an action-adventure video game developed by Core Design and released for the Game Boy Color by THQ under license from Eidos Interactive in 2000. A sequel, Tomb Raider: Curse of the Sword, was released in 2001.

Gameplay
In Tomb Raider, the player control Lara Croft though 14 levels spread across five areas. In each level, the player must solve puzzles, jump over obstacles, and defeat enemies. Lara can perform up to 25 different moves, including ledge-grabbing, backflips, and cliff-diving. The story of the game follows Lara's attempts to stop a group of treasure hunters from possessing the Nightmare Stone, a key capable of releasing the evil god Quaxet.

Development
Tomb Raider was developed by Core Design and published by THQ as the first Tomb Raider game for a handheld console and Nintendo hardware. Unlike most Game Boy Color games, which lock down the sprite resolution of the player character at 16 to 32 pixels tall, Core decided to make Lara 48 pixels high to accentuate her looks. The character also features 2000 frames of animation.

Reception

The game received an average score of 79% at GameRankings, based on an aggregate of 10 reviews. Frank Provo of GameSpot praised the levels, stating that each features a different gameplay theme, ranging from rope climbing in the temple levels to swimming in the caverns and dash-jumping over volcanic lava flows. Critics also highlighted Lara's smooth and acrobatic animations, and the fact that the player can perform a wide variety of moves with the limited buttons of the Game Boy Color.

References

External links

2000 video games
Eidos Interactive games
Game Boy Color games
Game Boy Color-only games
Single-player video games
THQ games
Video games set in Moscow
Video games set in South America
Tomb Raider spin-off games
Video games developed in the United Kingdom